Cladara limitaria, the mottled gray carpet moth, is a species of geometrid moth in the family Geometridae.

The MONA or Hodges number for Cladara limitaria is 7637.

References

Further reading

External links

 

Larentiinae
Articles created by Qbugbot
Moths described in 1860